Interpretations is an album by saxophonist Ricky Ford which was recorded in 1982 and released on the Muse label.

Reception

The AllMusic review by Scott Yanow stated "Ricky Ford performs five originals in his "Opus" series (none of which caught on) during this enjoyable advanced hard bop LP. The music is straight-ahead but unpredictable".

Track listing
All compositions by Ricky Ford except where noted
 "Interpretations Opus 5" – 7:06
 "Moon Mist" (Mercer Ellington) – 5:41
 "Se AABBA" – 5:53
 "Fix or Repair Daily" – 4:45
 "Lady A" – 4:21
 "Bostonova" – 5:06
 "Dexter" – 5:00

Personnel
Ricky Ford - tenor saxophone
Wallace Roney – trumpet (tracks 1, 3 & 4)
Robert Watson – alto saxophone (tracks 1, 3 & 4)
John Hicks – piano 
Walter Booker – bass 
Jimmy Cobb – drums

References

Muse Records albums
Ricky Ford albums
1982 albums
Albums recorded at Van Gelder Studio
Albums produced by Bob Porter (record producer)